The Nemeth Braille Code for Mathematics is a Braille code for encoding mathematical and scientific notation linearly using standard six-dot Braille cells for tactile reading by the visually impaired. The code was developed by Abraham Nemeth. The Nemeth Code was first written up in 1952. It was revised in 1956, 1965, and 1972. It is an example of a compact human-readable markup language.

Nemeth Braille is just one code used to write mathematics in braille. There are many systems in use around the world.

Principles of the Nemeth Code 
The Nemeth Code Book (1972) opens with the following words:

One consequence is that the braille transcriber does not need to know the underlying mathematics. The braille transcriber needs to identify the inkprint symbols and know how to render them in Nemeth Code braille. For example, if the same math symbol might have two different meanings, this would not matter; both instances would be brailled the same. This is in contrast to the International Braille Music Code, where the braille depends on the meaning of the inkprint music. Thus a knowledge of music is required to produce braille music.

Table of Nemeth braille codes

General signs

Number signs

Operators

Parentheses and brackets

Fractions

Other modifiers

Braille indicators

Comparison signs

Geometry

Arrows

Trig functions

Set theory

Misc. signs

Polygons

Triangles

Other signs

Greek letters and Latin letters 
Greek and Latin letters are based on the assignments of International Greek Braille.

See also
Gardner Salinas braille
WIMATS, application software to transcript mathematical and scientific text input into braille script.

References

External links 
 An Introduction to the Nemeth Braille Code for Mathematics
 PDF of the 1972 Nemeth Braille Code for Mathematics
 latex2nemeth, application software that transcribes LaTeX to Nemeth Braille.
 Braille files for the Nemeth Braille Code for Mathematics; and other resources about braille transcribing
 The History of Nemeth Code
 Braille Mathematical Notations: Different Braille Mathematical Codes from Around the World

Braille symbols
Mathematical notation
Mathematical markup languages